Auburn is a city in Barrow and Gwinnett counties in the U.S. state of Georgia. As of the 2020 census, the city had a population of 7,495.

History
Auburn incorporated in 1892 soon after the railroad was extended to that point.

Geography
Auburn is located in western Barrow County at  (34.016692, -83.831869).

Demographics

2020 census

As of the 2020 United States census, there were 7,495 people, 2,436 households, and 1,849 families residing in the city.

2010 census
As of 2010 Auburn had a population of 6,887.  The racial and ethnic composition of the population was 85.3% white, 4.9% black or African American, 0.4% Native American, 4.1% Asian, 3.3% from some other race and 2.1% reporting two or more races.  7.7% of the population was Hispanic or Latino.

2000 census
At the 2000 census there were 6,904 people, 2,260 households, and 1,846 families in the town. The racial makeup of the town was 88.80% White, 2.64% African American, 0.30% Native American, 4.17% Asian, 0.06% Pacific Islander, 2.23% from other races, and 1.80% from two or more races. Hispanic or Latino of any race were 4.35%.

Of the 2,260 households 51.0% had children under the age of 18 living with them, 67.0% were married couples living together, 9.8% had a female householder with no husband present, and 18.3% were non-families. 12.8% of households were one person and 1.7% were one person aged 65 or older.  The average household size was 3.05 and the average family size was 3.33.

The age distribution was 33.7% under the age of 18, 7.9% from 18 to 24, 41.5% from 25 to 44, 13.3% from 45 to 64, and 3.5% 65 or older.  The median age was 30 years. For every 100 females, there were 103.3 males.  For every 100 females age 18 and over, there were 103.2 males.

The median household income was $51,346 and the median family income  was $52,695. Males had a median income of $37,392 versus $24,381 for females. The per capita income for the town was $20,023.  About 3.6% of families and 5.2% of the population were below the poverty line, including 7.1% of those under age 18 and none of those age 65 or over.

References

External links
City of Auburn official website

Cities in Barrow County, Georgia
Cities in Gwinnett County, Georgia
Cities in Georgia (U.S. state)